Nienstädt is a municipality in the district of Schaumburg, in Lower Saxony, Germany. It is situated approximately 4 km southwest of Stadthagen, and 17 km east of Minden.

Nienstädt is part of the Samtgemeinde ("collective municipality") Nienstädt.

Geography 
Nienstädt lies on the northern slopes of the Bückeberge between Bückeburg and Stadthagen on the B 65 federal highway.

The four parishes in the municipality are Sülbeck, Liekwegen, Wackerfeld and Meinefeld. While Sülbeck and Nienstädt are bisected by the B 65, Liekwegen runs along the Bückeberg as a ribbon village. Wackerfeld and Meinefeld lie in open country north of Nienstädt.

Neighbouring communities (clockwise) are the towns of Stadthagen and Obernkirchen and the village of Helpsen.

References

Schaumburg
Principality of Schaumburg-Lippe